Nenadkevichite is a rare silicate mineral containing niobium with the chemical formula . It forms brown to yellow to rose colored orthorhombic dipyramidal crystals with a dull to earthy luster. It has a Mohs hardness of 5 and a specific gravity of 2.86.

It was first reported in 1955 from a nepheline syenite pegmatite in the Kola Peninsula. In addition it has been reported from 
Mont Saint-Hilaire, Canada; the Ilimaussaq complex, Greenland; Windhoek District, Namibia; and Zheltye Vody, Ukraine. It was named after Konstantin Avtonomovich Nenadkevich (1880–1963), Russian mineralogist and geochemist.

References
Webmineral data
Mindat with location data

Calcium minerals
Sodium minerals
Niobium minerals
Titanium minerals
Cyclosilicates
Orthorhombic minerals
Minerals in space group 55